Jaan Lippmaa (30 March 1942 – 16 November 2021) was an Estonian engineer and politician.

Lippmaa graduated from the Institute of Automation of Tallinn University of Technology in 1968 with a degree in automation and telemechanics. He worked in a dairy factory from 1968 to 1978 before working as  a fisherman from 1978 to 1990. From 1990 to 1992, he served on the Supreme Soviet of the Estonian Soviet Socialist Republic (renamed the Supreme Council of the Republic of Estonia in 1990). On 20 August 1991, he voted in favor of Estonian Restoration of Independence.

Awards
2002: Order of the National Coat of Arms, V Class
2006: Order of the National Coat of Arms, III Class

References

1942 births
2021 deaths
Estonian engineers
Estonian politicians
Voters of the Estonian restoration of Independence
Tallinn University of Technology alumni
Recipients of the Order of the National Coat of Arms, 3rd Class
Recipients of the Order of the National Coat of Arms, 5th Class
Politicians from Pärnu